Lance Corporal is a military rank, used by many armed forces worldwide, and also by some police forces and other uniformed organisations. It is below the rank of corporal, and is typically the lowest non-commissioned officer (NCO), usually equivalent to the NATO Rank Grade OR-3.

Etymology
The presumed origin of the rank of lance corporal derives from an amalgamation of "corporal" from the Italian phrase capo corporale ("head of the body") with the now-archaic lancepesade, which in turn derives from the Italian lancia spezzata, which literally means "broken lance" or "broken spear", formerly a non-commissioned officer of the lowest rank. It can be translated as "one who has broken a lance in combat", and is therefore a leader. "Lance" or "lances fournies" was also a term used in Medieval Europe to denote a unit of soldiers (usually 5 to 10 men strong).

Brazil
After the independence of Brazil in 1822, the new Brazilian Army followed the Portuguese system of ranks, having also the rank of anspeçada. The rank existed also in the Brazilian States' Military Police Forces and in the Military Firefighters Corps. The rank of anspeçada was discontinued in Brazil in the first half of the 20th century.

Commonwealth of Nations
In Commonwealth forces, a lance corporal is usually the second-in-command of a section. Lance corporals are commonly addressed as "corporal", with "lance jack" or "half-screw" (with corporals being "full screws") being common colloquialisms for the rank. Much like the use of bombardier instead of corporal in artillery units, lance corporals are known as lance bombardiers in the UK, Australia and New Zealand. The badge of rank is a single chevron worn on both sleeves or on an epaulette.

Australia and New Zealand
Lance corporal is the lowest of the non-commissioned officer ranks in the Australian Army and New Zealand Army, falling between private and corporal. It is the only appointed rank, and thus demotion is easier than with other ranks. A commanding officer can demote a lance corporal, whereas other ranks require a court martial for demotion. A lance corporal is usually the second in command of a section, and is in control of the gun group in an infantry section.  There is no equivalent rank within the Australian or New Zealand Air Force or Navy.

Second corporal was also formerly used in Australia in the same way that it was used in the British Army.

Bangladesh
In the Bangladesh Army, the rank of lance corporal is above the rank of sainik (সৈনিক) and below the rank of corporal.

Canada
The Canadian Armed Forces abolished the Canadian Army rank of lance corporal on their creation as a unified force in 1968.

United Kingdom

British Army and Royal Marines
Lance corporal (LCpl or formerly L/Cpl) is the lowest ranking non-commissioned officer in the British Army and Royal Marines, between private and corporal (although officially they have a NATO grade of OR3, due to their having the same battlefield role of fire team commander as a sergeant in the U.S. Army they are often treated as OR5s when working with U.S. forces). The badge of rank is a single chevron worn on both sleeves, or on an epaulette on the front of the Combat Soldier 95 dress standard (although lance corporals in the Foot Guards, Honourable Artillery Company, 1st The Queen's Dragoon Guards, and The Queen's Royal Hussars wear two chevrons and in the Household Cavalry two chevrons surmounted by a gild crown are worn). The Royal Artillery uses the term lance bombardier instead.

The date of introduction of lance corporals to the British Army is unclear, but the rank is mentioned in late-18th century military essays such as Major William Young's "An essay on the Command of Small Detachments" (1766) and John Williamson's "The Elements of Military Arrangement" (1781):

"When from sickness or other causes there are not in a company a sufficient number of non-commission officers to do the duty, the captain can appoint corporals to do the duty of serjeants, who are called lance serjeants, and private men to do the duty of corporals, who are called lance corporals."

The designation "chosen man", used during the Napoleonic Wars, was possibly a precursor to the rank. The first mention of a lance corporal in The Times is in 1819, although the first mention in the London Gazette is not until 1831. The first mention in the London Gazette of a lance corporal in the Royal Marines is in 1838.

Until 1 September 1961, lance corporal and lance bombardier were only appointments rather than substantive ranks, given to privates who were acting NCOs, and could be taken away by the soldier's commanding officer (whereas a full corporal or bombardier could only be demoted by court martial). The Royal Engineers and Army Ordnance Corps also used the similar rank of second corporal, which was a substantive rank (also wearing one chevron), until 1920. Until 1920, bombardiers in the Royal Artillery were equivalent to second corporals and until 1918 (when the rank of lance bombardier replaced it), acting bombardiers were equivalent to lance corporals (both wearing one chevron).

In the infantry, a lance corporal usually serves as second-in-command of a section and commander of its delta fire team. It is also a rank commonly held by specialists such as clerks, drivers, signallers, machine-gunners, and mortarmen. In the Intelligence Corps and Royal Military Police, all other ranks are promoted to lance corporal on the completion of their training.

Royal Air Force
On 1 April 2010, the rank of lance corporal was introduced into the RAF Regiment, although it is not used by other branches of the Royal Air Force. RAF Regiment lance corporals have powers of charge over aircraftmen, leading aircraftmen and senior aircraftmen, but not junior technicians or senior aircraftmen technicians, who, despite being OR2s, require a corporal or above to charge if required.

Cadet Forces

The British cadet forces reflect the ranks of their parent services, so the Army Cadet Force, the Army section of the Combined Cadet Force (CCF), and the various marine cadet organisations use cadet lance corporal as their lowest NCO rank. In the CCF (RAF), this rank is also used as the lowest NCO rank (it was formerly known as junior corporal before its introduction into the RAF Regiment). The Air Training Corps and the naval cadet forces do not use the rank.

Finland

The equivalent of lance corporal in the Finnish Defence Forces Army and Air Forces is korpraali (Finnish) or korpral (Swedish). Although it translates as "corporal", this is not considered an NCO rank.

Typically, the promotion is given to rank-and-file conscripts who perform exceptionally well. Conscripts attending the NCO course are promoted to the rank during the first half of the NCO course, prior to promotion to corporal or to being detailed to the Reserve Officer School.

Reservists in the rank of private may be promoted to the rank if they distinguish themselves during a refresher exercise or in international deployment.

Portugal
In the Portuguese Army, the equivalent of a lance corporal rank used to be that of anspeçada. This rank was replaced at the end of the 19th century by the present rank of segundo-cabo (second corporal), the former rank of cabo (corporal) being renamed primeiro-cabo (first corporal).

Singapore

Singapore Armed Forces 
The Lance Corporal (LCP) rank in the Singapore Armed Forces (SAF) is between the rank of Private (PTE) and Corporal (CPL).

Lance-corporals who are appointed second-in-command/third-in-command of a section can give commands to the rest of the section. National servicemen are usually promoted to this rank after completing their respective vocational courses and within the first year of service. Servicemen who fail to pass their Individual physical proficiency test (IPPT) during their active service will have their rank capped at LCP regardless of vocation.

A lance-corporal wears rank insignia of a single point-down chevron with an arc above it (similar to an inverted US Army PFC rank insignia).

Uniformed youth organisations 
In the National Cadet Corps (NCC), the National Police Cadet Corps (NPCC) and the National Civil Defence Cadet Corps (NCDCC), the rank of lance corporal is below the rank of corporal. Generally, the rank is awarded to cadets in secondary two. NCC, NPCC and NCDCC lance corporals rarely, if not never, have the chance to command a squad.

NCC lance corporals wear the same rank insignia as that of the SAF, except that the letters 'NCC' are below the insignia so as to differentiate NCC cadets from SAF personnel. NPCC and NCDCC lance corporals wear the same rank insignia as that of an SCDF lance corporal, except that the letters 'NPCC' and 'NCDCC' are below the insignia so as to differentiate NPCC and NCDCC cadets from Singapore Police Force and Singapore Civil Defence Force personnel respectively.

United States

Army

Lance corporal was a title used in the United States Army to denote privates serving as temporary non-commissioned officers. The title of lance corporal existed in the U.S. Army since at least 1802, as the U.S. Army Institute of Heraldry documents its first occurrence in an "unofficial journal" dated that year. The first official use of the title of lance corporal is documented in the General Regulations for the Army, or, Military Institutes (Articles 18 and 20), authorised by an Act of Congress on 2 March 1821 and published by the War Department in July 1821 and again on 1 March 1825.

In the General Regulations for the Army of the United States (Article XVI, Paragraph 64), published on 25 January 1841, and again in the 1847 edition (Article XIII, Paragraph 121; Article XIV, Paragraph 134; and Article XLIX Paragraph 818), the title of lance corporal is authorised. Again, in the Revised Army Regulations of 1861 published on 10 August 1861 and in the 1863 edition "With An Appendix Containing the Changes and Laws Affecting Army Regulations And Articles Of War To June 25, 1863" (Article 40, Paragraph 971), lance corporal is authorised. Lance corporal is again authorised in Regulations of the Army of the United States and General Orders In Force on the 17th of February 1881 (Article LV, Paragraph 812) and in Regulations of the Army of the United States 1895 (Article XXXII, Paragraph 257).

In the edition of 1901 "With Appendix Separately Indexed And Showing Changes to January 1, 1901", in the Appendix, page 331, in Headquarters of the Army, General Orders, No. 42, June 30, 1897, Part II, the lance corporal is authorised to wear "...a chevron having one bar..." In Regulations for the Army of the United States 1904 (Article XXX, Paragraph 263), "...no company shall have more than one lance corporal at a time, unless there are noncommissioned officers absent by authority, during which absences there may be one for each absentee." This proscription appears again in Article XXX, Paragraph 272 of Regulations for the Army of the United States 1910, and the editions of 1913, and 1917 "Corrected to April 15, 1917 (Changes, Nos. 1 to 55)".

In 1920, the former lance corporal insignia of rank was assigned to the rank of private first class in War Department Circular No. 303, dated 3 August 1920. However, the Institute of Heraldry states that some older US Army Tables of Organization and Equipment still in use in 1940 continued to authorise lance corporals.

In February 1965, the US Army announced that effective from 1 September 1965, pay grade E-3 would be redesignated as lance corporal. The rank insignia was to be the pre-World War II specialist grade 6 insignia of one chevron above one arc, or "rocker". However, by September 1965 the plan was cancelled. The insignia was, however, adopted for pay grade E-3, which continued to be named private first class.

Marine Corps
Lance corporal (LCpl) is the third enlisted rank in order of seniority in the United States Marine Corps, just above private first class and below corporal. It is the most commonly held rank in the USMC, and the highest one that a marine can hold without being a non-commissioned officer.

The USMC is the only component of the U.S. Armed Forces to currently have lance corporals. Promotion to lance corporal is based on time in grade, time in service, and the conduct of the marine. Further promotion to the NCO ranks (corporal and above) is competitive and takes into account the individual service record of the marine. There can only be a certain number of corporals and sergeants in each MOS, so even with a qualifying score, promotions may be delayed due to an excessive number of corporals occupying billets in a certain MOS.

From the earliest years of the Corps, the ranks of lance corporal and lance sergeant were in common usage. The rank of lance corporal has been in the Marine Corps since the 1830s. Marines were appointed temporarily from the next lower rank to the higher grade but were still paid at the lower rank. As the rank structure became more firmly defined, the rank of lance sergeant fell out of use, with the rank of lance corporal remaining in the Corps into the 1930s, but this unofficial rank became redundant when the rank of private first class was established in 1917. The rank of lance corporal fell out of usage prior to World War II, before it was permanently established in the sweeping rank restructuring of 1958.

Other agencies 
Some law enforcement agencies, most notably the South Carolina Highway Patrol, use the rank for non-supervisory officers.

Gallery

Variants

Sweden
Sweden uses the rank of vicekorpral (previously vicekonstapel, or "vice constable", in the artillery and anti-aircraft artillery) between private and korpral. It was primarily a training grade discontinued in 1972 but reinstated in 2009.

See also
 Comparative military ranks
 Lance sergeant
 Lances fournies
Terminal Lance

References

Military appointments of Canada
Military ranks of Australia
Military ranks of the British Army
Military ranks of Singapore
Military ranks of the Commonwealth
Military ranks of the Royal Marines
Police ranks
Military ranks of the United States Marine Corps
United States military enlisted ranks
Military ranks of the Royal Air Force
Military appointments of the British Army
Military appointments of the Royal Marines
Former military ranks of Canada